Endangered Species is a Canadian computer-animated children's television series created by Asaph Fipke, produced by Nerd Corps Entertainment and distributed internationally by DHX Media for Teletoon that premiered on the channel on March 3, 2015, and aimed for kids ages 6-11.

Synopsis
Pickle the yellow bunny rabbit, Merl the American red squirrel, and Gull the white seagull, live together in a stump in the middle of a park. The three animals deal with numerous adventures and dangers.

Production
The original idea for the series was conceived in 2010 and was centered more heavily around themes of environmentalism than the finished product. Among some other differences was the fact that the character Merl was not present in the original draft, and the names and appearances of the other two main characters were different from the final version.

Broadcast
In the UK, it airs on CBBC, where it premiered on July 13, 2015.

Main characters
 Tabitha St. Germain as Pickle, a yellow-colored bunny rabbit who loves to go on wild adventures.
 Sam Vincent as Merl, an American red flying squirrel who speaks with a Spanish accent and he is cautious about it.
 Lee Tockar as Gull, a stump-winged, white seagull who is slow and dim-witted but loveable and was going through that one.

Episodes

References

External links

 Show page on Teletoon

Endangered Species at IMDb

Teletoon original programming
2015 Canadian television series debuts
2015 Canadian television series endings
Television series by DHX Media
Canadian computer-animated television series
2010s Canadian animated television series
Canadian children's animated comedy television series
Animated television series about birds
Animated television series about rabbits and hares
Animated television series about squirrels
English-language television shows